Warunee Phetwiset ( born 13 December 1990) is a Thai international footballer who plays as a midfielder for MH Nakhon Si Lady.

Honours

International
Thailand 

 AFC Women's Championship 
 Fourth Place: 2018
 Fifth Place: 2014
 AFF Women's Championship: 2011, 2015, 2016, 2018
 Southeast Asian Games: Gold Medal: 2013

References

External links 
 
 

1990 births
Living people
Women's association football midfielders
Warunee Phetwiset
Footballers at the 2014 Asian Games
Warunee Phetwiset
Warunee Phetwiset
Warunee Phetwiset
Southeast Asian Games medalists in football
Footballers at the 2018 Asian Games
Competitors at the 2013 Southeast Asian Games
Competitors at the 2017 Southeast Asian Games
2019 FIFA Women's World Cup players
Warunee Phetwiset
Competitors at the 2019 Southeast Asian Games
2015 FIFA Women's World Cup players
FIFA Century Club